Time-domain harmonic scaling (TDHS) is a method for time-scale modification of speech (or other audio signals), allowing the apparent rate of speech articulation to be changed without affecting the pitch-contour and the time-evolution of the formant structure. TDHS differs from other time-scale modification algorithms in that time-scaling operations are performed in the time domain (not the frequency domain). TDHS was proposed by D. Malah in 1979.

References

External links
PICOLA and TDHS

Data compression
Digital signal processing
Audio engineering